The 1977 Society of West End Theatre Awards were held in 1977 in London celebrating excellence in West End theatre by the Society of West End Theatre. The awards would not become the Laurence Olivier Awards, as they are known today, until the 1984 ceremony.

Winners and nominees
Details of winners (in bold) and nominees, in each award category, per the Society of London Theatre.

Productions with multiple nominations and awards
The following 15 productions received multiple nominations:

 4: Privates on Parade
 3: Bubbling Brown Sugar and Just between Ourselves
 2: Bedroom Farce, Cause Célèbre, Dusa, Fish, Stas and Vi, King Lear, Macbeth, Once a Catholic , State of Revolution, Stevie, The Fire That Consumes, The Kingfisher, The Plough and the Stars, Volpone and Wild Oats

The following production received multiple awards:

 2: Privates on Parade

See also
 31st Tony Awards

References

External links
 Previous Olivier Winners – 1977

Laurence Olivier Awards ceremonies
Laurence Olivier Awards, 1977
1977 in London
1977 theatre awards